The Max Holste MH.1521 Broussard is a 1950s French six-seat utility monoplane designed by Max Holste to meet a French Army requirement.

Design and development 
Following the end of the Second World War, Avions Max Holste designed and built a new two-seat trainer and tourer aircraft, the Max Holste MH.52, of which only small numbers were built. Holste then responded to a French Army requirement for an artillery spotter aircraft for a lightweight liaison and observation aircraft. The resulting design, the MH.152, had a fuselage based on that of the MH.52 and a high-mounted wing. It was powered by a  Salmson 8 As.04 engine and had an enclosed, fully-glazed cabin seating a pilot and four passengers. A prototype flew on 12 June 1951. While it demonstrated good short-field performance, the French Army's needs had changed, with it now requiring a robust utility aircraft similar to the de Havilland Canada DHC-2 Beaver. 
 

As  a result, the company decided to develop a slightly larger version, the MH.1521 with the engine changed to a Pratt and Whitney Wasp Junior, which at  provided almost twice as much power and a slab-sided fuselage giving room for up to seven seats. The MH.1521 is a braced high-wing monoplane with twin vertical tail surfaces. It has a fixed tailwheel landing gear and is powered by a nose-mounted Pratt & Whitney R-985 radial piston engine. It first flew on 17 November 1952. It was later named the Broussard (lit. Man of the Bush, in the context of bush pilots rather than Bushmen).  Its development was enthusiastically supported at a political level by WWII fighter ace and French war hero Pierre Clostermann, a close friend of Max Holste.   Clostermann wrote a faction novel, "Leo 25 Airborne", based on his experiences flying Broussards with Escadrille ELO 3/45 in Algeria.

The first production aircraft made its maiden flight on 16 June 1954, and 363 were built before production ended in 1961. Its similarity to the de Havilland Canada DHC-2 Beaver in looks, capability and performance led it to be nicknamed "the French Beaver".

Operational history 
It saw service in the Algerian War as an Army cooperation aircraft, with more than 150 deployed, mostly as an artillery spotter and in an air supply/ambulance role, where its good short-field performance and resistance to ground fire were required.  Its distinctive sound, made by its noisy radial engine and large propeller, was a disadvantage as the Algerian guerrillas could hear its approach long before other aircraft.  

Following Algerian independence in 1963, the Algeria-based Broussards returned to France, where they were used for liaison aircraft, while many of France's surplus Broussards were transferred to newly independent ex-French colonies. The Broussard remained in service with the French Air Force until December 1987, and with the French Army until December 1993, while the French Navy retired its last examples in 1996. Civil-owned Broussards can still be seen in Denmark, France, the UK, and the United States being operated by enthusiasts or collectors.

Variants 

MH.152
First prototype of the Broussard series, powered by a Salmson 8 As.04 inverted V-8 engine.
MH.1521
Prototypes, five built plus two pre-production aircraft and 19 pre-production military variants.
MH.1521A
Aircraft modified for agricultural use.
MH.1521C
Production for civil or non-French military customers, 36 built.
MH.1521M
Production for French military, 319 built.
MH.1522
Based on MH.1521, with full span leading-edge slats and double-slotted trailing edge flaps to improve stall performance. Prototype, modified from a pre-production aircraft, flown on 11 February 1958, but later converted back to MH.1521 standard. 
MH.153
The prototype MH.152 powered by a Turbomeca Astazou turboprop engine. First flew in this form June 1957.

Operators

Military operators

Argentine Air Force
Argentine National Gendarmerie

 Benin Air Force

Royal Cambodian Air Force

 Cameroon Air Force

 Central African Republic Air Force

 Chad Air Force

 French Air Force
 French Army
French Naval Aviation

 Cote d'Ivoire Air Force

 Force Aérienne du Djibouti

 Gabonese Air Force

 Malagasy Air Force

 Malian Air Force

 Mauritania Islamic Air Force

 Royal Moroccan Air Force

 Niger Air Force

 Portuguese Air Force

 Senegalese Air Force

 Armée de l'Air Togolaise

 Force Aérienne de Haute-Volta

Civil operators

Securite Civile

Surviving aircraft

G-YYYY (s/n 208) flies from Eggesford, UK in 2010.
F-GIBN (s/n 261) stationed in Walldürn, Germany and in flying condition.
HB-RSL (s/n 6) was stationed in Biel-Kappelen, Switzerland and in flying condition but was destroyed in a hangar fire on July 3, 2016.
N246MH 1960 (s/n 246) is located in Friendswood, Texas, USA and in flying condition.
N118MH (s/n 118) is registered in Caldwell, Idaho, USA in flying condition.
 N4022 (s/n 22) US FAA registered to a German company but operating in California as of Oct 2018.
LV-X769 is registered as experimental aircraft in Argentina. It's in flying conditions as of March 2020.
 G-HOUR Owned by Bremont.
OY-SLV (s/n 303) is located in Tarm, Denmark and in flying condition.

Specifications (MH.1521M)

See also

References

Notes

Bibliography

External links 

Max Holste MH.1521 Broussard – surviving aircraft

1950s French military utility aircraft
Max Holste aircraft
Single-engined tractor aircraft
High-wing aircraft
Aircraft first flown in 1952
Twin-tail aircraft